Candace Kaye Kroslak van Dell (born July 22, 1978) is an American actress known for her role as Lindy Maddock in the Swedish-American soap opera Ocean Ave.

Early life 
Kroslak was born in Chicago, Cook County, Illinois, of Slovak descent.

Career 
Before Ocean Ave., Kroslak appeared in the movies Demonicus, Planet of the Apes and Soul Survivors. In the last few years she has had guest roles on such television series as CSI: Miami, What About Brian, Shark, Las Vegas, How I Met Your Mother and Scrubs.

Most recently, she played Brandy in the 2006 direct to video movie American Pie Presents: The Naked Mile. In 2011 she appeared on Days of Our Lives for 12 episodes and appeared in Take Me Home Tonight alongside Topher Grace, Chris Pratt, Anna Faris and Teresa Palmer.

She also appeared on the cover of the April 2011 and 2013 issue covers of Runner's World magazine.

Candace is a model at Wilhelmina Modeling Agency worldwide and writes self-help books. She is a regular blogger for HuffPost.

Personal life 
In 2013, Kroslak got married and now works under the name Candace van Dell.

Filmography

Film

Television

External links 
Official website
Youtube channel

1978 births
American film actresses
American television actresses
Living people
Actresses from Chicago
American people of Slovak descent
21st-century American women